Onyinye Wilfred Ndidi (born 16 December 1996) is a Nigerian professional footballer who plays as a defensive midfielder for  club Leicester City and the Nigeria national team. Ndidi is known for his defensive prowess.

Club career

Genk
On 14 January 2015 Nath Boys Academy agreed a    €180,000 transfer deal with Genk. The deal was completed on 15 January 2015. Ndidi made his Belgian Pro League debut with Genk on 31 January 2015 against Charleroi in a 1–0 away defeat. He played the first 74 minutes of the game, before being substituted for Jarne Vrijsen.

During the Belgian League play-off game against Club Brugge, Ndidi scored a long-range goal, which was named the goal of the season in the Belgian league. After receiving an attempted-clearance outside the penalty box, he lofted the ball smoothly over an opposing player before unleashing a ferocious volley into the top right corner. The ball was adjudged to be travelling at over 111 km/h.

Leicester City
On 3 December 2016, Genk agreed a £17 million transfer deal with Leicester City. The deal was confirmed on 5 January 2017.

Ndidi made his debut for the club on 7 January 2017, in a 2–1 win against Everton in the third round of the FA Cup. He made his first Premier League start on 14 January 2017 against Chelsea at home in a 3–0 defeat. In the English FA Cup game against Derby County on 8 February 2017, Ndidi came on in the first half of extra time and scored his first goal for Leicester through a long-range shot. In a 3–1 win over Liverpool on 27 February 2017, Ndidi won 11 of his 14 tackles, a feat bettered only by Chelsea's N'Golo Kanté who made 14 tackles against the same club in January.

Ndidi was sent off for the first time in his career during Leicester's 3–0 home defeat to Crystal Palace on 16 December 2017.

He scored the opener of the 2019–20 season for Leicester in a draw against Chelsea on 18 August 2019.

2020–21 season
On 13 September 2020, Ndidi started at centre-back in Leicester City's opening game of the 2020–21 Premier League campaign and kept a clean sheet in a 3–0 win away to West Bromwich Albion. Ndidi suffered an adductor injury on 20 September 2020 and was ruled out for 6–12 weeks. He returned to action on 3 December in Leicester's Europa League loss to Zorya Luhansk.

On 19 January 2021, Ndidi scored his first goal of the season in Leicester City's league fixture against Chelsea. The match eventually ended with Leicester beating their opponents 2–0 and the club went top of the league table.

International career

Ndidi was part of the Nigerian youth setup during his time at Nathaniel Boys of Lagos. While playing the African U-17 Championship with Nigeria, he was excluded along with two other players from the competition as a precaution, following an MRI age test that suggested he was just slightly above the threshold. Notwithstanding, he joined up with his teammates in the U-20 team the following year, forming the bedrock of the midfield. He was called up to the senior Nigeria national football team on 8 October 2015, making his debut in the friendly game against DR Congo, and playing again a few days later in the 3–0 win against Cameroon, when he replaced John Obi Mikel in the 63rd minute.

He was selected by Nigeria for their 35-man provisional squad for the 2016 Summer Olympics.

In May 2018 he was named in Nigeria’s preliminary 30-man squad for the 2018 World Cup in Russia. He was included in the African Cup of Nations 2019 squad and played in Nigeria's first match against Burundi. On 25 December 2021, Ndidi was selected in Nigeria's 2021 Africa Cup of Nations 28-man squad by Nigeria's caretaker coach Austin Eguavoen. On January 22, 2022, after the Africa Cup of Nations, Cameroon 2021 Group Stage, Confédération Africaine de Football (CAF) shortlisted Ndidi in the group stage's best team as a substitute alongside Mohamed Salah and Sadio Mane.

Personal life
Ndidi grew up in the barracks as his father was a serving Army officer before his retirement. Discipline and education were the priority there, while football was a passion his father frowned upon. “Any time my dad went to work I would go and play,” Ndidi said in an interview with BBC World Service.

In May 2019, Ndidi married his longtime girlfriend Dinma Fortune in Abuja.

In 2019, Ndidi started studying for a degree in Business and Management at De Montfort University.

Career statistics

Club

International

Honours
Leicester City
FA Cup: 2020–21
FA Community Shield: 2021

References

External links

Profile at the Leicester City F.C. website

1996 births
Living people
Sportspeople from Lagos
Nigerian footballers
Nigeria under-20 international footballers
Nigeria international footballers
Association football midfielders
K.R.C. Genk players
Leicester City F.C. players
Belgian Pro League players
Premier League players
2018 FIFA World Cup players
2019 Africa Cup of Nations players
2021 Africa Cup of Nations players
FA Cup Final players
Nigerian expatriate footballers
Expatriate footballers in Belgium
Expatriate footballers in England
Nigerian expatriate sportspeople in England
Nigerian expatriate sportspeople in Belgium